Downtown Honolulu is the current historic, economic, and governmental center of Honolulu, the capital and largest city of the U.S. state of Hawaii. It is bounded by Nuuanu Stream to the west, Ward Avenue to the east, Vineyard Boulevard to the north, and Honolulu Harbor to the south. Both modern and historic buildings and complexes are located in the area, with many of the latter declared National Historic Landmarks on the National Register of Historic Places.

Districts

Downtown Honolulu can be subdivided into four neighborhoods, each with its own central focus and mix of buildings.  These areas are the Capitol District, the Central Business District, Chinatown, and the Waterfront.

Capitol District

The Capitol District, or Civic Center, contains most of the federal, state, and city governmental buildings and is centered on the Hawaii State Capitol, Iolani Palace, and Honolulu Hale (city hall).  It is roughly bounded by Richards Street on the west, Ward Avenue on the east, Vineyard Boulevard to the north, and Nimitz Highway to the south.  Significant buildings in this area include:

 Old Advertiser Building
 Aliiōlani Hale
 Bishop Estate Building
 Frank F. Fasi Municipal Building
 Hawaii State Capitol
 Hawaii State Library
 Honolulu Fire Department Headquarters
 Honolulu Hale
 Honolulu Police Department Headquarters
 Iolani Barracks
 Iolani Palace
 Kakaako Fire Station
 Kalanimoku Building
 Kamehameha V Post Office
 Kawaiahao Church
 Kawaiahao Plaza
 King Kalakaua Building
 Kapuaiwa Building
 Leiopapa a Kamehameha Building
 Mission Memorial Building
 The Pacific Club
 Prince Kūhiō Kalanianaole Federal Building
 Territorial Building
 Washington Place

Central Business District
Centered on Bishop Street and Fort Street Mall, the central business district is roughly bounded by Nuuanu Avenue, Nimitz Highway, Richards Street, and Vineyard Boulevard.  This area contains most of the headquarters buildings of Hawaii-based companies and most of the skyscrapers.  Buildings in this area include:

 1100 Alakea Street
 1132 Bishop Street
 Alexander & Baldwin Building
 Ali'i Place
 American Savings Building
 Arcade Building
 Armstrong Building
 Army and Navy YMCA
 Bishop Bank Building
 Bishop Square
 Cades Schutte Building
 Capitol Place
 Cathedral Church of Saint Andrew
 Cathedral of Our Lady of Peace
 C. Brewer Building
 Central Fire Station
 Central Pacific Plaza (Central Pacific Bank)
 Century Square
 City Financial Tower
 Davies Pacific Center
 Dillingham Transportation Building
 Executive Center
 Financial Plaza of the Pacific (Bank of Hawaii)
 Finance Factors Center
 First Hawaiian Center
 Fort Street Mall
 Harbor Court
 Hawaii Pacific University
 Hawaiian Electric Building
 Hawaiian Telcom Building
 Judd Building
 Central Middle School (Honolulu, Hawaii)
 McCandless Building
 Melchers Building
 Oahu Railway and Land Terminal
 Oceanit Center
 Pacific Guardian Center
 Pinnacle Honolulu
 Pioneer Plaza
 Royal Brewery
 Stangenwald Building
 Theo H. Davies Building
 TOPA Financial Tower
 Yokohama Specie Bank
 YWCA Building

Chinatown

Located between Nuuanu Stream and Nuuanu Avenue, Chinatown at one time was the center of Chinese cultural contact on the island.  Central to this area is the open-air Oahu Market.  The area around Nuuanu Avenue has become an Arts District, thanks to the renovation of the Hawaii Theatre.  Buildings in this area include:

 Hawaii Theatre
 Lum Yip Kee Building
 Nippu Jiji Building
 Oahu Market
 Wo Fat Building

Waterfront

Honolulu's waterfront area centers on Aloha Tower, which was once the tallest building in Hawaii and where cruise ships would dock before the advent of air travel between Hawaii and the U.S. Mainland.  Recently, cruise ships between the Hawaiian Islands now dock at Honolulu Harbor.  Buildings in this area include:

 Aloha Tower
 Falls of Clyde
 Hawaii Maritime Center
 Honolulu Foreign Trade Zone

Government and infrastructure
The Honolulu Police Department operates the Alapai Police Headquarters and the Downtown Police Station in Downtown Honolulu.

The United States Postal Service operates the Downtown Honolulu Post Office at 335 Merchant Street.

See also
List of tallest buildings in Honolulu

References

External links

Honolulu
Economy of Honolulu
Hawaiian architecture
Neighborhoods in Honolulu
Special economic zones of the United States